The International Network for Quality Assurance Agencies in Higher Education (INQAAHE) is an international quality assurance body. It works closely with national accreditation bodies, including the Council for Higher Education Accreditation in the US, and other coordinating bodies, such as the European Association for Quality Assurance in Higher Education (EQNA) in Europe, and with academicians to control educational quality in around 140 countries, and is headquartered in Barcelona, Spain.

The organisation began with only 8 members in 1991, and as of 2022, it has over 280 members.

See also
 List of recognized accreditation associations of higher learning

References

Higher education accreditation
Quality assurance
Higher education
Educational organizations
Organizations established in 1991